Johannes Friedrich (27 August 1893, in Leipzig-Schönefeld – 12 August 1972, in Berlin) was a German hittitologist who published the Hethitisches Elementarbuch (1940), and the Kurzgefasstes Hethitisches Wörterbuch (1966). A translation of his book "Entzifferung Verschollener Schriften und Sprachen" ( "Extinct Languages" ) was published by Philosophical Library New York 1957: a study of Ancient Orient languages, including Egyptian hieroglyphics, cuneiform writing, Hittite hieroglyphics and other scripts and languages of the Old world.

In 1933 Friedrich signed the Vow of allegiance of the Professors of the German Universities and High-Schools to Adolf Hitler and the National Socialistic State.

"Extinct Languages" translated from the original German "Entzifferung Verschollener Schriften und Sprachen" by Frank Gaynor

1893 births
1972 deaths
Linguists from Germany
Hittitologists
20th-century linguists